Yağcı is a village in the Hocalar District, Afyonkarahisar Province, Turkey. Its population is 196 (2021).

References

Villages in Hocalar District